Expedition 56 was the 56th expedition to the International Space Station, which began on June 3, 2018, upon the departure of Soyuz MS-07. Andrew Feustel, Oleg Artemyev, and Richard R. Arnold were transferred from Expedition 55, with Andrew Feustel taking the commander role. Alexander Gerst, Serena M. Auñón-Chancellor, and Sergey Prokopyev launched aboard Soyuz MS-09, on June 6, 2018. Expedition 56 ended with the departure of Soyuz MS-08 on October 4, 2018.

Crew 

Originally NASA Astronaut Jeanette Epps was assigned as flight engineer for Expeditions 56 and 57, becoming the first African American space station crew member and the 15th African American to fly in space, but on January 16, 2018, NASA announced that Epps had been replaced by her backup Serena M. Auñón-Chancellor with no announced explanation as to why.

Spacewalks

*denotes spacewalks performed from the Pirs docking compartment in Russian Orlan suits.All other spacewalks were performed from the Quest airlock.

Uncrewed spaceflights to the ISS
Resupply missions that visited the International Space Station during Expedition 56:

Leak

On August 29, 2018, a small leak was detected through a drop in air pressure by the flight controllers.  After learning about the leak upon waking up, the astronauts discovered a 2 mm hole in the orbital module of the Soyuz MS-09 spacecraft.  The hole was initially repaired with tape, followed by a permanent repair with gauze and epoxy.

References

Expeditions to the International Space Station
2018 in spaceflight